Deer Run is a residential neighbourhood in the southeast quadrant of Calgary, Alberta. It is located in a bend of the Bow River, and is surrounded to the east and south by the Fish Creek Provincial Park. It is bounded to the north by North Deersaxon Circle and the community of Deer Ridge and to the west by Bow Bottom Trail.

The land was annexed to the City of Calgary in 1961 and Deer Run was established in 1978. It is represented in the Calgary City Council by the Ward 14 councillor.

Demographics

Residents in this community had a median household income of $76,038 in 2000, and there were 6.1% low income residents living in the neighbourhood. As of 2000, 16.9% of the residents were immigrants. A proportion of 6.3% of the buildings were condominiums or apartments, and 14% of the housing was used for renting.

Education
The community is served by Deer Run Elementary public school, and designated out of district junior high school and high school is provided by Wilma Hansen Junior High and Lord Beaverbrook High School.

See also
List of neighbourhoods in Calgary

References

External links
Deer Run Community Association

Neighbourhoods in Calgary